Podonosma orientalis, commonly known as golden drop, is a species of flowering plant resembling a low-lying shrub of the Boraginaceae family, first described by Carl Linnaeus. It is endemic to Turkey, the Eastern Mediterranean, namely, Syria, Lebanon, Israel (Palestine), and stretching as far as the woodlands and desert steppes of Jordan, Iraq, and in Western and Southern Iran. In Israel it is a regular feature in the Judean and Samaritan deserts, as also on Mount Carmel, where it is very common.

Description
The simple leaves and stems of plant are entirely covered in green or whitish hairs, and sheds its foliage between August and October. Yellow to white and light blue flowers of a corolla-cylindrical shape appear on the plant's stalk between February and June. 

In Arabic, the species of plant is known by the name maṣīṣ, whence its Hebrew name is also derived.

Habitat
Golden drop flourishes on hard rock outcrops, especially in garrigue terrain. In Wadi Khureitun (Judea), it grows in small vertical cracks and holes alongside Sonchus suberosus and Centaurea eryngioides, while in Wadi Qelt (Judea) it is found growing along the narrowest part of the chasm. In Jordan, it is found in Wadi Zerka Main (Moab) on the hard limestone.

Uses
The plant contains saponin, a chemical substance which produces a soapy lather. Arabs in Palestine would break off leaves and stems from the plant and form them into a wad for scouring pots and pans, or for burnishing copperware or silverware.

In Arab folk-medicine, macerated leaves of the plant, mixed with wheat flour, were placed on a heated compress and applied to the head in order to relieve migraine headaches.

The plant's flowers are edible.

References

External links
Flowers In Israel -- Podonosma orientalis

Flora of Jordan
Flora of Israel
Flora of Palestine (region)
Flora of Lebanon
Flora of Syria
Flora of Iran
Saponaceous plants
Boraginaceae
Taxa named by Carl Linnaeus